The first season of the American television series Warehouse 13 premiered on July 7, 2009, and concluded on September 22, 2009, on Syfy. The show aired on Tuesdays at 9:00 pm ET. The season consisted of 12 episodes. The show stars Eddie McClintock, Joanne Kelly, Saul Rubinek, Genelle Williams and Simon Reynolds.

Synopsis
At the beginning of season one, Pete and Myka, two secret service agents protecting the president, were transferred against their will to the remote Badlands Wilderness in South Dakota. They were given a job at Warehouse 13 to preserve and retrieve various talisman artifacts worldwide under the supervision of Dr. Artie Nielsen. At first, Pete and Myka were reluctant to be partners, but they grew closer during the season. At the beginning of season one, there was a breach in Warehouse 13's computer system, which turned out to be caused by Claudia Donovan, who wanted Artie to help her bring her brother back from interdimensional limbo where he was trapped. After they saved Joshua, Mrs. Frederic wanted Artie to either hire Claudia or "deal with" her since she knew too much about Warehouse 13. However, Artie was reluctant to hire her until Leena convinced him that it would be better for Claudia to work at the Warehouse. 

Throughout season one, Artie's former partner, MacPherson, returned and dug up Artie's past. Myka and Pete learned of Artie's criminal record but changed his name and joined the Warehouse. Later it is revealed that MacPherson has been using Leena to steal items from the Warehouse so he can sell them to buyers around the world until Pete, Myka, and Artie eventually catch him and then take him to the Warehouse to be bronzed. He uses Leena again to reverse his bronzing while using Harriet Tubman's thimble to frame Claudia, and he escapes.

Cast

Main
 Eddie McClintock as Pete Lattimer
 Joanne Kelly as Myka Bering
 Saul Rubinek as Artie Nielsen
 Genelle Williams as Leena
Simon Reynolds as Daniel Dickinson

Recurring
 C. C. H. Pounder as Mrs. Irene Frederic
 Allison Scagliotti as Claudia Donovan
 Roger Rees as James MacPherson

Guest
 Gabriel Hogan as Sam Martino
 Tricia Helfer as Bonnie Belski
 Joe Flanigan as Jeff Weaver
 Joe Morton as Reverend John Hill
 Mark A. Sheppard as Benedict Valda
 Michael Hogan as Warren Bering
 Susan Hogan as Jeannie Bering

Episodes

DVD release

References

General references

External links

 
 

1
2009 American television seasons

es:Anexo:Episodios de Warehouse 13
fr:Liste des épisodes de Warehouse 13